The Majalla, often directly transliterated as Al Majalla (Arabic:المجلة, "the magazine") is a Saudi-owned, London-based political news journal published in Arabic, English and Persian. The magazine's headquarters in Saudi Arabia is in Jeddah.

From 1980 to 2009 a print edition was issued weekly, every Sunday. In April 2009 the magazine moved to an all-online format. The online version continues to be published weekly.

History and profile
The Majalla was launched by Hisham Hafiz in London in 1980. The magazine is owned by Saudi Research and Marketing Group (SRMG), and was reestablished in 1987 by Ahmed bin Salman, then chairman of the SRMG. The former chairman of the SRMG is Turki bin Salman Al Saud.

The SRMG owns many other newspapers such as Arab News, Al Eqtisadiah, Urdu News and Asharq Al Awsat and magazines, including Sayidaty, Al Jamila, Arrajol, Bassim and Heya. 

The Majalla, along with Sayidaty and Al Yamamah, is among popular magazines in Saudi Arabia.

Editors
Abdul Karim Abou-Nasr was the first chief editor of the magazine. He created the concept and managed it from April 1, 1979 to October 22, 1983. The first issue was published on February 16, 1980. During this period, Elias Mansour was the managing editor and Gaby G. Tabarani was the secretary of the editorial staff.  From 1983 to 1987 the chief editor of the magazine was Othman Al Omeir who owns news portal Elaph. Then Abdel Rahman Al Rashid served as the editor-in-chief of the magazine from 1987 to 1998. Adel Al Toraifi was appointed editor-in-chief of the Majalla in 2010, and the chief editor of the magazine. In July 2012, Toraifi was also appointed deputy deputy chief editor of Asharq Al Awsat, a daily published by SRMG. Toraifi's term as the editor-in-chief of the magazine ended in July 2014 when Salman bin Yousuf Al Dossary was appointed to the post. His term ended in 2016 when Ghassan Charbel was appointed to the post.

The Majalla offers the readers an overview of the main weekly news, analysis and exclusive reports with a focus on political affairs. The magazine also provides news from USA Today, Time Magazine, World Monitor and MEED.

Because of its close connection with the Arab world, The Majalla has often broken stories from sources close to militant groups like the PLO, Hamas, and Al-Qaeda. It also publishes articles written by senior Saudi princes like Prince Turki Al Faisal.

The magazine is also well known for its political cartoons, particularly those by the late Mahmoud Kahil. These were often critical of Israel and the United States. The Majalla sponsored London's first Festival for Arab Caricature in 1989.

Circulation
In 1994 The Majalla sold 116,000 copies. The audited circulation of the magazine at the end of the 1990s is stated to be just under 100,000 copies. Its 2009 circulation was 86,961 copies.

References

External links
Home page of the Arabic edition
Editors page

1980 establishments in the United Kingdom
2009 disestablishments in the United Kingdom
Arabic-language magazines
Arabic-language websites
Defunct political magazines published in the United Kingdom
Magazines established in 1980
Magazines disestablished in 2009
Magazines published in London
Magazines published in Saudi Arabia
Mass media in Jeddah
Monthly magazines published in the United Kingdom
News magazines published in the United Kingdom
Online magazines published in the United Kingdom
Online magazines with defunct print editions
Saudi Arabian news websites
Weekly magazines published in the United Kingdom